Alme (or Almé) is a village in the commune of Mayo-Baléoin Adamawa Region, Cameroon, near the .

Population 
In 1971 Alme contained 300 inhabitants, mostly Kutin.

In the 2005 census, 1813 people were counted in the village of Alme and 4651 in the canton of the same name

References

Bibliography
 Jean Boutrais (ed.), Peuples et cultures de l'Adamaoua (Cameroun) : Actes du colloque de Ngaoundéré, du 14 au 16 janvier 1992, ORSTOM, Paris ; Ngaoundéré-Anthropos, 1993, 316 p. 
 Dictionnaire des villages de l'Adamaoua, ONAREST, Yaoundé, octobre 1974, 133 p.

External links
 Mayo-Baléo , on the website Communes et villes unies du Cameroun (CVUC)

Populated places in Adamawa Region